South School is a historic school building in the city of Reedsburg, Wisconsin. It was designed by Frank Moulton, and built by Flad & Moulton in 1937. The school was built in the Colonial Revival style. South School served over 250 students every year in the School District of Reedsburg, until it was closed in 2019. Currently the building is unused, but there has been interest in remodeling the building into apartments.

History

Early history 
The first South School building was built in 1889, and it consisted of 2 classrooms. A second storey was added on in 1895, and it was considered to be a modern schoolhouse. A new building was planned on the South School property. This new building was also called South School and it was designed by Frank Moulton, of Flad & Moulton (current day Flad Architects), and partially funded by the Works Progress Administration. It served students from the east side of the Baraboo River, and grades kindergarten to 12. The original South School building was torn down, and replaced with tennis courts.

South School served as the only high school in Reedsburg, after the original high school was torn down. In 1957 Webb High School was built, which helped with the overcrowding issue at South School. However, Webb High School was to be built in three phases to save cost, so some high school classes were still held at South School for a number of years. This caused unfortunate scheduling for a number of students who had to attend classes at both schools.

Late 1900s - present 
With the completion of the new middle school building in 1968, South School became known as South Elementary School, as it was now only serving kindergarten through 5th grade. Over the few decades, many referendums have been proposed to close South School, but none had passed until 2017. Over this time, the building was remodeled, but the look of the school was maintained.

South School was added to the Wisconsin Register of Historic Places on 1983. The South School gym had been used to hold high school prom, among other events. In 2017, a referendum was held to close South School and build a new elementary school. The School District of Reedsburg made the decision to close the school after an overwhelming majority of people voted yes in the referendum. On June 11, 2019 the school officially closed. On April 27, 2020 the Reedsburg Common Council approved a proposal to convert South School into affordable housing.

References 

Reedsburg, Wisconsin
Colonial Revival architecture in Wisconsin
School buildings completed in 1937
School buildings on the National Register of Historic Places in Wisconsin
Defunct public schools in Wisconsin